The Best of The Easybeats + Pretty Girl is the first compilation album by The Easybeats featuring a selection of songs recorded by the group between 1965 and 1966.  The album was originally released in Australia and New Zealand under the Parlophone label under the then current licensing arrangement by the band's production company Albert Productions.

Background
After the success of the band's single "Friday On My Mind" in the U.K., The Easybeats continued work with the single's producer Shel Talmy on a debut album for their international label United Artists Records. The finished album, titled Good Friday, was released in Europe in May 1967.  However, due to contract issues, no album of the new material was released in their home country of Australia.

Instead Albert Productions compiled "greatest hits" package of the band's most popular Australian singles and EP tracks.  Three songs from the Good Friday album were included on the album, with "Pretty Girl" (which hadn't yet seen a release in Australia) promoted as a "new" song.  The album was released in May 1967 during the group's homecoming tour of Australia.

Releases

The album was first released in May 1967 during the band's homecoming tour of Australia.  It was reissued on the budget Drum Records label in June 1975, along with The Best of The Easybeats Volume 2.  The album's cover art title was changed to The Best of The Easybeats Featuring Stevie Wright.

The first release on CD was in 1986 on the Albert Productions label and again in the 1997 through EMI.  The 1997 released would again change the cover art and title to simply The Best of The Easybeats.

On 6 August 2013, the album was remastered and made available through the iTunes Store.  For the 2014 Australian Record Store Day, a limited edition 180 gram vinyl LP was released.  This vinyl release was released by Albert Productions and remastered by renowned mastering engineer Don Bartley.

Reception

Released May 1967 just before the band's homecoming tour, it reached #3 on the Kent Music Report.  It was the 20th highest selling album in Australia of 1967. In October 2010, it was listed at No. 6 in the book, 100 Best Australian Albums.

Track listing

Side A

Side B

Personnel
The Easybeats
 Stevie Wright - vocals, percussion
 Harry Vanda - vocals, harmonies, guitars
 George Young - vocals, harmonies, guitars
 Dick Diamonde - vocals, bass
 Snowy Fleet - drums

Producers
 Ted Albert - producer
 Shel Talmy - producer for "Friday on My Mind", "Made My Bed ; Gonna Lie in It" and "Pretty Girl"

Sales charts and certification

Australian Charts

References
Albert Music - Best of The Easybeats + Pretty Girl

The Easybeats albums
1967 greatest hits albums
Albert Productions compilation albums
Parlophone compilation albums
Albums produced by Shel Talmy
Albums recorded at IBC Studios